Hogback Summit (el. 5033 ft.) is a mountain pass in Lake County, Oregon traversed by U.S. Route 395.

References

Mountain passes of Oregon
Landforms of Lake County, Oregon